Italy in a Day - Un giorno da italiani is a 2014 Italian-British documentary film directed by Gabriele Salvatores. It was part of the Out of Competition section at the 71st Venice International Film Festival.

Salvatores used the crowdsourced documentary Britain in a Day as a prototype to produce Italy in a Day, which included clips selected from 45,000 video submissions recorded on 26 October 2013.  The film was said to reflect the fears of Italians during a recession, their uncertainty over their national identity, and their refusal to give up on dreams.

References

External links
Official website

2014 documentary films
British documentary films
Films directed by Gabriele Salvatores
Italian documentary films
2010s British films
2010s Italian films